Medvid is a surname. Notable people include:

 Fedir Medvid (1943–1997), Ukrainian footballer
 Ivan Medvid (born 1977), Bosnian footballer
 Vyacheslav Medvid (born 1965), Ukrainian footballer

See also
 

Surnames of Slavic origin